Together for Sustainability AISBL (TfS) is a joint initiative of chemical companies, founded in 2011. It focuses on the promotion of sustainability practices in the chemical industry's supply chain, currently gathering chemical companies around a single standard of auditing and assessment.

Sustainability in chemical supply chains 

Over the past few years sustainability aspects in the chemical industry have become more important and holistic. Nowadays, chemical companies' measures focusing sustainability include apart from ecological aspects also social concerns and collaborative issues.

Today, it has been well accepted that the creation of sustainable chemical supply chains requires a joint effort beyond individual businesses. These efforts should integrate chemical companies, suppliers, customers as well as consumers.

Prof. Dr Wolfgang Stolze and Marc Müller of the University of St. Gallen summarize the development in the chemical industry in recent years as follows: "The scope of sustainability in the chemical industry has evolved from a firm-level construct with a strong focus on green aspects to a chain-level approach attempting to address the triple bottom line of economic, social and environmental elements."

History 

The Together for Sustainability initiative was founded in 2011 by BASF, Bayer, Evonik, Henkel, Lanxess, and Solvay. The objective was to develop a global supplier engagement program and improve their own sustainability sourcing practices in line with the United Nations Global Compact. Since January 2015, the TfS initiative is incorporated as an international non-profit association according to the Belgian law.

Since June 2012, TfS conducts  assessments and audits by independent experts, as well as the early partnership with the French company EcoVadis, which provided with sustainability scorecards and benchmarks.

In May 2019 Bertrand Conquéret, CPO of Henkel, was elected as president of the TfS.

Objectives 

TfS, a global, procurement-driven initiative, delivers a framework with tools – TfS Assessments and TfS Audits – to assess and improve the sustainability performance of chemical companies and their suppliers. TfS has extended its program including now scope 3 GHG emissions. TfS delivers the de facto global standard for environmental, social and governance performance of the chemical supply chains. The program is based on the UN Global Compact and Responsible Care principles.

The globally applicable TfS framework with standardized tools creates transparency of the sustainability performance of chemical companies and their suppliers across the globe, providing the basis for collaboration to continuously improve performance.

A TfS Assessment evaluates a supplier's sustainability management approach and performance. It is conducted via an online questionnaire tailored to the specificities of the chemical industry, supported by documents providing proof of implementation. TfS works with EcoVadis, specialized in CSR assessments, as its partner and service provider.

A TfS Audit is an on-site evaluation of a company's sustainability practices by an independent third-party auditor approved by TfS. The scope of a TfS Audit covers a supplier business location such as a production site or a warehouse. During a TfS Audit, the supplier's sustainability performance is verified against a set of audit criteria on management, environment, health & safety, labour & human rights, and governance issues. These criteria have been defined by TfS and are tailored to the requirements of the chemical industry.

TfS assesses and audits sustainability performance of supply chains for both chemical companies and their suppliers, through a shared infrastructure. 

The results of the analysis of data and documents are combined on a scorecard visible to all TfS members through a shared infrastructure.

TfS has extended its program with scope 3 GHG emissions. The objective of this program is to develop pragmatic approaches to measure GHG emissions data as well as to obtain it from TfS companies' suppliers and share it across TfS member companies. It is paramount that the collected and shared data are consistent, reliable, robust and effective.

Structure 

The TfS is governed by two main organs, the General Assembly and the Steering Committee. 
The General Assembly is formed by all the Chief Procurement Officers of the member companies, and holds power over the direction and structure of the organization, as well as approving the decisions of the Steering Committee. 
The Steering Committee, formed by six elected members of the General Assembly as well as the TfS president, is the executive council of the organization and decides upon its activities and projects.

Additionally, TfS has several Regional Operating Committees (Asia, North America and South America) as well as, currently, five mission-specific work streams led and staffed by participants from the TfS member companies:
 Work Stream 1: Governance and Partnerships
 Work Stream 2: TfS Assessments
 Work Stream 3: TfS Audits
 Work Stream 4: TfS Communications and Capability Building
 Work Stream 5: Scope 3 GHG Emissions

TfS' headquarter is in Brussels. It manages the day-to-day affairs of the organization and stays in close contact with the representatives and coordinators of the member companies.

TfS has a partnership with several other chemical industry associations: American Chemistry Council (ACC), European Chemical Industry Council (CEFIC), German Chemistry Council (VCI),  China Petroleum and Chemical Industry Federation (CPCIF), Indian Chemical Council (ICC), and the Associação Brasileira da Indústria Química (ABIQUIM).

Members 
TfS Membership is open to all companies in the chemical industry who subscribe to the United Nations Global Compact, Responsible Care, and show a commitment to sustainability. TfS membership has been growing steadily since its founding, and in April 2022 its members have a joint global turnover of over €500 billion.

As of February 2023, TfS has 43 member companies.

Recognition 

 2015 - Highly Commended at the Ethical Corporation Responsible Business Award 2015
 2016 - Sustainable Purchasing Leadership Council Market Transformation Award
2018 - Best Third Sector/Not-for-profit Procurement Project at CIPS Supply Management Awards
 2018 - Finalist for international Responsible Business Awards

See also 

 ISO 26000
 Corporate social responsibility
 United Nations Global Compact
 Sustainable Stock Exchanges Initiative

Notes

References

External links 

 TfS Initiative website

Chemical industry
Sustainability
Corporate social responsibility
Supply chain management
Organisations based in Brussels